Strathmeade Springs is an unincorporated community in Fairfax County, in the U.S. state of Virginia.

Schools

Realstate

General
Strathmeade Springs consists mostly of midsize houses that have attracted many buyers. Home prices range from $370,000 – $600,000

Trends
Homes are commonly on the market for 68 days and purchased either at or above asking price. Property taxes are around $5,989 per year. Homes averagely are $240 per square foot and typically list for around $485,000.

References

External links
 Information at neighbborhoods.com

Unincorporated communities in Virginia
Unincorporated communities in Fairfax County, Virginia
Washington metropolitan area